Alexey Torchinski is a Russian former pair skater. He is a three-time (1990–1992) World Junior champion with partner Natalia Krestianinova.

Competitive highlights
(with Krestianinova)

References

Navigation

Soviet male pair skaters
Russian male pair skaters
World Junior Figure Skating Championships medalists